The Simple Life is a 1919 silent film comedy short directed by and starring Larry Semon. It was produced and distributed by the Vitagraph Company of America.

Cast
Larry Semon - A Farmer's Boy
Lucille Carlisle - Captain Tillie
Frank Alexander - A Farmer
Frank Hayes - A Police Officer

References

External links
The Simple Life at IMDb.com

1919 short films
American silent short films
American black-and-white films
Films directed by Larry Semon
Vitagraph Studios short films
Silent American comedy films
1919 comedy films
1919 films
1910s American films